Greene projectile points are stone projectile points manufactured by Native Americans what is now the Northeastern United States generally in the time interval of 300–800 AD.

Description 

They are lanceolate in shape with weak or no shoulders and are 2¼ to 2½ times as long as they are wide.

Age and cultural affiliations 

Their first recorded appearance is around 400 AD and vanished around 800 AD with the onset of the Kipp Island phase in central New York.

Distribution 

These points are found primarily in the middle Hudson Valley of New York State, but are found as far east as Massachusetts.

See also
Other projectile points

References 

Projectile points
Indigenous weapons of the Americas